The Special Naval Warfare Force (FGNE) is the special forces unit of the Spanish Navy. It was created on June 10, 2009 through the fusion of the Special Operations Unit (UOE) of the Spanish Navy Marines and the Special Combat Divers Unit (UEBC) of the Navy Diving Center. Before the merger, between 2004 and 2009, the two units operated under a single Special Naval Warfare Command. Between 1967 and 2009, the special operations of the Spanish Navy were conducted by the UOE, whose many traditions the FGNE adopted – including the use of the special forces "green beret", the  selection course, and the organization of operational units into . Inheriting the reputation and continuing the record of the UOE, the FGNE "has long been one of Europe's most respected special forces."

Mission and organization 
The Special Naval Warfare Force is the special forces unit of the Spanish Navy specialized in operations in maritime, land and coastal environments. The unit is composed mainly of members of the Marines.

It is composed of a Command and Control unit, a support unit for the Command and Control unit, combat units and their support units, and the services combat units (health, supply, transportation, weapons, material, etc.).

Jobs assigned to them:

 Reconnaissance of maritime coastlines and beaches
 Inland reconnaissance in depth
 Direct actions on terrestrial targets, such as the destruction of enemy installations or the capture of enemy personnel
 Assault on ships
 Military assistance
 Non-combatants evacuation operations
 Hostage rescue
 Counter-insurgency and counter-terrorism operations

Commander 
The Special Naval Warfare Force is under the command of a colonel or a ship-of-the-line captain who receives the title of Commander of the Special Naval Warfare Force. As a force integrated into the Spanish Marines, it is under the purview of the General Commander of the Marines.

Deployments 
The FGNE has been deployed across several operations, including Atalanta in Somalia, United Nations Interim Force in Lebanon and Hispaniola in Haiti.

The Special Naval Warfare Force also took part during the hijacking of the Spanish fishing vessel Alakrana in October 2009, parachuting into Somali waters and being recovered after by the frigate Canarias. 

They have also seen action in Iraq and Afghanistan as well as being deployed to Senegal and Cape Verde.

Equipment 

 SIG Sauer P230
 Llama M82
 FN P9-17
 Glock 17 Gen.5
 FN Five-seven 
 FN P90 
 Heckler & Koch MP5A3/A4/A5
 Heckler & Koch MP5SD3/SD4/SD5
 Heckler & Koch G-36E/K/C 
 SIG 553
Heckler & Koch HK-416A5 11"
 CETME C 
 CETME L/LC/LV
 Remington 870
 FN Minimi Para 5.56mm
 FN Minimi MK3 7.62mm 
 MK46, MK48 mod 0
 CETME Ameli
 M-60D
 Rheinmetall MG3 
 Accuracy International Arctic Warfare 
 AXMC .338
 Barrett M82A1/M95
 Heckler & Koch HK-417 12" ASSAULTER and 20" SNIPER 
 Rocket launcher C-100
 Rocket launcher C-90C
 Mk.19 Mod.3 grenade launcher

References

External links 
 Página en la web oficial de la Armada Española

Spanish Navy
Special forces of Spain